The Ethiopian Catholic Eparchy of Bahir Dar–Dessie (Bahir Dar–Dessie of the Ethiopics) is one of the three  suffragan eparchies (Eastern Catholic dioceses) in the ecclesiastical province (covering all Ethiopia) of the Metropolitan Ethiopian Catholic Archeparchy of Addis Abeba, which comprises the entire Ethiopian Catholic Church sui iuris, which practices the Alexandrian Rite in the liturgical Ge'ez language. Yet it depends on the missionary Roman Congregation for the Oriental Churches.

Despite the eparchy's double name, also mentioning Dessie (another Amhara city in northern Ethiopia), the diocese has its sole cathedral eparchial (episcopal) see in the Cathedral of Egziabher Ab, in Bahir Dar.

The Eparchy of Bahir Dar – Dessie comprises 8 Zones of Amhara Regional State:

North Gondar
South Gondar 
East Gojam
West Gojam 
Agew Awi 
Wag Hemra 
North Wello 
South Wello

The Special Oromia Zone

1 Zone of Benishangul Gumuz Regional State:

Metekel Zone

3 Zones of Afar Regional State:

 Zone 1
 Zone 4
 Zone 5

History 

It was established on 19 January 2015 as Eparchy (Diocese) of Bahir Dar–Dessie, on territory split off from its Metropolitan archdiocese, Ethiopian Catholic Archeparchy of Addis Abeba, where its first Eparch had been auxiliary bishop before his appointment (aged 55) to the newly created see.

Statistics 

As per 2015, it pastorally served 17,544 Catholics (0.1% of 16,215,850 total) on 221,766 km² in 24 parishes and 53 missions with 24 priests (3 diocesan, 21 religious), 47 lay religious (4 brothers, 43 sisters).

Episcopal ordinaries 
 (all Ethiopic Rite)

Suffragan Eparchs (Bishops) of Bahir Dar–Dessie
 Lisane-Christos Matheos Semahun (2015.01.19 – ...); previously Titular Bishop of Mathara in Numidia (2010.01.05 – 2015.01.19) as Auxiliary Bishop of mother see Addis Abeba of the Ethiopics (Ethiopia) (2010.01.05 – 2015.01.19).

See also 
 Catholic Church in Ethiopia
 List of Catholic dioceses in Ethiopia

References

Sources and external links 
 GCatholic, with Google satellite photo

2015 establishments in Ethiopia
Catholic dioceses in Ethiopia
Eastern Catholic dioceses in Africa